The 2022–23 Iowa State Cyclones men's basketball team represented Iowa State University during the 2022–23 NCAA Division I men's basketball season. The Cyclones were coached by T. J. Otzelberger in his second season as head coach, and 10th season at Iowa State. They played their home games at Hilton Coliseum in Ames, Iowa as members of the Big 12 Conference.

Previous season
The Cyclones started the season 12–0, good for one of the best starts in school history, including being crowned the champion of the NIT Season Tip-Off with wins over 25th-ranked Xavier and 9th-ranked Memphis. In Otzelberger's first season as head coach he claimed the best start to an Iowa State coaching career by winning his first 10 games, ultimately winning his first 12 games before losing at home to No. 1 Baylor to end his unbeaten start at Iowa State. They finished the season 2021–22 season 22–13, 7–11 in Big 12 play to finish a tie for seventh place. As the No. 6 seed in the Big 12 tournament, they lost to Texas Tech in the quarterfinals. They received an at-large bid to the NCAA tournament as the No. 11 seed in the Midwest region. There they defeated LSU and Wisconsin to advance to the Sweet Sixteen. In the Sweet Sixteen, they lost to Miami.

Offseason

Departures

Incoming transfers

2022 recruiting class

Roster

Schedule and results

|-
!colspan=12 style=""| Regular Season

|-
!colspan=12 style=""| Big 12 Tournament

|-
!colspan=12 style=""| NCAA Tournament

References

Iowa State Cyclones men's basketball seasons
Iowa State
Iowa State Cyclones men's basketball
Iowa State Cyclones men's basketball
Iowa State